Hadruridae is a family of scorpions belonging to the order Scorpiones.

Genera:
 Hadrurus Thorell, 1876
 Hoffmannihadrurus Fet & Soleglad, 2004

References

Scorpions